Francesco Giorgi is the partner of the Greek member of the European Parliament Eva Kaili. 
Giogri started his relationship with Kaili in 2017. At the time Giorgi worked as an assistant at the European Parliament to Antonio Panzeri.
Giogri and Kiali have a child together. 

Giogri was arrested by Belgian authorities min-December 2022 in the context of the Qatargate scandal. He admitted having accepted bribes and alleged his partner Kaili was not directly involved in the corruption scheme.
Giogri was released from prison in February 2023.

References

Living people
European Parliament